From List of National Natural Landmarks, these are the National Natural Landmarks in North Carolina.  There are 13 in total.

North Carolina
North Carolina geography-related lists